Kataraki is a panchayat village in the southern state of Karnataka, India. Administratively, kataraki under Bilagi Taluka of Bagalkot District in Karnataka. The village of Kataraki was a mandal panchayat including 7 villages. Katarki is on the north shore of the Ghataprabha River. There is famous temple called Ramalingeshwara on the banks of the Ghataprabha River and Patri Basaveshwara temple is there.

Divisions 
The Kataraki gram panchayat oversees three villages: Katarki, Lingapur (S.K.) and Shiraguppi.

References

External links
 

Villages in Bagalkot district